Amphiaspidida is a taxon of extinct cyathaspidid heterostracan agnathans whose fossils are restricted to Lower Devonian marine strata of Siberia near the Taimyr Peninsula.  Some authorities treat it as a suborder of Cyathaspidiformes, while others treat it as an order in its own right as "Amphiaspidiformes."  In life, they are thought to be benthic animals that lived most of their lives mostly buried in the sediment of a series of hypersaline lagoons. Amphiaspids are easily distinguished from other heterostracans in that all of the plates of the cephalothorax armor are fused into a single, muff-like unit, so that the forebody of the living animal would have looked like a potpie or a hot waterbottle with a pair of small, or degenerated eyes sometimes flanked by preorbital openings, a pair of branchial openings for exhaling, and a simple, slit-like, or tube-like mouth.

Taxonomy
Amphiaspidida is traditionally regarded as the sister-taxon or daughter-taxon of the cyathaspidid family Ctenaspidae (ne "Ctenaspididae"), though no formal shared traits are identified between the two groups.  The ctenaspidid cyathaspid, Boothiaspis, of Lower Devonian Canada, was initially described as an amphiaspid.

As mentioned earlier, Amphiaspidida is treated as either a suborder of Cyathaspidiformes, or as an order in its own right, sometimes referred to as "Amphiaspidiformes."  Regardless of its own status, Amphiaspidida is divided into three superfamilies, Amphiaspidoidei, Hibernaspidoidei, and Siberiaspidoidei.  An additional species, Gunaspis orientalis, is treated as Amphiaspidida incertae sedis because it is known only from fragments with distinctive micro-ornamentation.

Amphiaspidoidei
The superfamily Amphiaspidoidei contains four families.

Amphiaspididae
This family contains two monotypic genera, including the type genus Amphiaspis, and Amphoraspis

Edaphaspididae
This family is monotypic, and contains the monotypic genus Edaphaspis.

Gabreyaspididae
This family contains four genera, Gabreyaspis, Prosarctaspis, Pelaspis, and Tareyaspis.

Olbiaspididae
This family contains three genera, Olbiaspis, Kureykaspis and Angaraspis.

Hibernaspidoidei
This superfamily contains three families.

Hibernaspididae
This family is monotypic, containing only the genus Hibernaspis.

Eglonaspididae
This is a diverse family that contains five genera, including Eglonaspis, Gerronaspis, Lecaniaspis, Empedaspis, and Pelurgaspis.

Aphataspididae
This family contains two monotypic genera, Aphataspis and Putoranaspis.

Siberiaspidoidei
This superfamily contains two families, Siberiaspididae, and Tuxeraspididae.

Siberiaspididae
This family contains two monotypic genera, Siberiaspis, and Argyriaspis.

Tuxeraspididae
This family contains three monotypic genera, Tuxeraspis, Litotaspis, and Dotaspis.  Tuxeraspis and Litotaspis are known primarily from fragments and portions of the head-region, while Dotaspis is known from a mostly intact headshield.

References

 
Devonian jawless fish
Early Devonian fish of Europe
Devonian fish of Asia
Fossils of Russia
Fauna of Siberia
Fish of Russia
Endemic fauna of Russia
Krasnoyarsk Krai
Cyathaspidiformes
Early Devonian first appearances
Early Devonian extinctions